Jason Vrable (born January 23, 1985) is an American football coach who is the wide receivers coach and passing game coordinator for the Green Bay Packers of the National Football League (NFL). He previously served as an assistant coach for the New York Jets, Buffalo Bills, University of Charleston, Syracuse University, Robert Morris University, Marietta College, and the University of South Florida.

Vrable played college football as a quarterback at Marietta College.

Early years
A native of South Park, Pennsylvania, Vrable graduated with a bachelor's degree in sports medicine in 2007 and completed a master's degree in sports management from Robert Morris University in 2009.

Coaching career

South Florida
In the summer of 2007, Vrable began coaching at the University of South Florida as a strength intern.

Marietta College
In the fall of 2007, Vrable returned to his alma mater, Marietta College, to be the quarterbacks coach.

Robert Morris
In 2008, Vrable was hired as the quarterbacks coach of Robert Morris University.

Syracuse
In 2009, Vrable was hired by Syracuse University as the assistant wide receivers coach. In 2010, Vrable was promoted to assistant quarterbacks coach.

Charleston
In 2011 and 2012, Vrable was the offensive coordinator, quarterbacks coach, and running backs coach for the University of Charleston.

Buffalo Bills
From 2013 to 2015, Vrable was the offensive quality control coach of the Buffalo Bills. In 2016, Vrable was promoted to assistant quarterbacks coach. In week 3 of 2016, Vrable was named the interim running backs coach.

New York Jets
In 2017 and 2018, Vrable worked as an offensive assistant for the New York Jets.

Green Bay Packers
On February 1, 2019, Vrable was hired as the offensive assistant for the Green Bay Packers. On March 12, 2020, Vrable was promoted to wide receivers coach. On February 1, 2022, Vrable was promoted to wide receivers/passing game coordinator.

References

External links
 Green Bay Packers bio

1985 births
Living people
American football centers
Buffalo Bills coaches
New York Jets coaches
Green Bay Packers coaches
National Football League offensive coordinators
Players of American football from Pennsylvania
Syracuse Orange football coaches